Russian Women is a two-poem cycle by Nikolai Nekrasov, telling the stories of two women, the wives of the Decembrists, who followed their husbands, Sergey Trubetskoy and Sergey Volkonsky, to their exile in Siberia. Part one, Princess Trubetskaya (Княгиня Трубецкая), was written in July 1871; part two, Princess M.N. Volkonskaya (Княгиня М.Н. Волконская, based upon Volkonskaya's  memoirs), a year later. Both were published by Otechestvennye Zapiski, in April 1872 and January 1873, respectively, in 'softened', censorship-friendly versions. Both were included into the 1873 Stikhotvoreniya (Стихотворения, Poems) collection, now as a single, two-part work.

References

Poetry by Nikolay Nekrasov
1872 poems